Ion Bîrlǎdeanu (born 1 August 1958) is a retired Romanian sprint kayaker. He won a bronze medal in the K-1 1000 m event at the 1980 Olympics, placing sixth in the doubles. He also won seven medals at the ICF Canoe Sprint World Championships with a gold (K-2 10000 m: 1979), five silvers (K-1 500 m: 1981, K-1 1000 m: 1979, 1981; K-2 500 m: 1978, K-4 1000 m: 1978), and one bronze (K-2 10000 m: 1981).

Bîrlǎdeanu spent most of his career with Steaua București, and after retiring from competitions worked as a coach there. Later he trained the national junior and senior teams, and in 2005 became president of the Romanian Canoe and Kayak Federation.

References

External links

1958 births
Canoeists at the 1980 Summer Olympics
Living people
Romanian male canoeists
Olympic canoeists of Romania
Olympic bronze medalists for Romania
Olympic medalists in canoeing
ICF Canoe Sprint World Championships medalists in kayak

Medalists at the 1980 Summer Olympics
People from Galați County